Dig Your Grave Friend... Sabata's Coming is a 1971 Spanish western film directed by Juan Bosch and starring by Richard Harrison, Fernando Sancho and Raf Baldassarre. It was scored by Enrique Escobar.

Cast

References

External links
 

Spanish Western (genre) films
Films directed by Juan Bosch
Films with screenplays by Ignacio F. Iquino
1971 Western (genre) films
1971 films
1970s Spanish-language films